Ridge Farm Studio was one of the earliest residential recording studios in the United Kingdom. The studio operated for over twenty-five years and had artists, musicians, and producers from all over the world record and produce music there.

The studio was established in 1975 by Frank Andrews, a lighting technician who had toured across the UK with bands such as Queen, ABBA, and the Rolling Stones. Andrews returned home from tour to discover his parents had moved to a different place, which is where Ridge Farm Studio was born. He started the studio with his brother, Billy, as a quiet place for bands to rehearse.

Ridge Farm Studio did well enough that Andrews was eventually able to buy the property from his parents. It remained a popular location well into the 1990s, after the surge of Britpop. However, bookings eventually dwindled. Joe Jackson was the last person to record there in 2002.

It was located in the village of Rusper, England near the Surrey and Sussex border. The oldest part of the building, originally a mediaeval farmhouse, and what was to become Ridge Farm Studio was built in the mid-17th century and additions to the building were added over the centuries.

With a client list that ranged from The Smiths, Bad Company, Queen, Peter Gabriel, Ozzy Osbourne, Pearl Jam, Oasis, Supergrass, The Three Tenors, Mew, and more, Ridge Farm Studio closed in early 2003.  It is now used as a facility for weddings, banquets and meetings.

Client list of artists, musicians and producers by year
 1975 Bad Company, Queen, Back Street Crawler
 1976 Jethro Tull, Robin Trower, Automatic Fine Tuning
 1977 Thin Lizzy, The Sensational Alex Harvey Band, Hawkwind, Roy Harper, Lone Star, Gallagher & Lyle, Mick Taylor, Camel
 1978 Roxy Music, Bad Company, Steve Hillage, Magazine, Gong
 1979 Steve Hillage, The Slits, The Pop Group, Penetration
 1980 Ozzy Osbourne, Whitesnake, The Undertones, Echo & the Bunnymen, The Three Degrees, Orchestral Manoeuvres in the Dark, The Beat, Bonnie Tyler, Judie Tzuke, Bill Drummond, Ulf Lundell, Steve Lipson
 1981 Ozzy Osbourne, Lindisfarne, Uriah Heep 
 1982 Bad Company, Mick Ralphs, Y&T, John Cooper Clarke, Chris Kimsey
 1983 Peter Gabriel, Ozzy Osbourne, Michael Schenker Group, Paul Brady 
 1984 Dexys Midnight Runners, A Flock of Seagulls, Captain Sensible, Limahl, Bruce Foxton, Naked Eyes, Tony Mansfield
 1985 The Smiths, Little Richard, a-ha, Clannad, The Escape Club, Hipsway, Gary Langan 
 1986 Frankie Goes to Hollywood, Kissing the Pink (KTP), The Mission, The Adult Net, Ian Broudie, Rush, Trevor Horn, Stock Aitken Waterman, Tim Palmer, Steve Lipson, Paul Samwell-Smith
 1987 Wet Wet Wet, Grayson Hugh, Curiosity Killed the Cat, All About Eve, The Bolshoi, Miguel Bosé, Tony Mansfield
 1988 Status Quo, That Petrol Emotion, Peter Collins, Gary Langan, Hurrah!
 1989 Prefab Sprout, Energy Orchard, Giant, Thomas Dolby, Gary Katz 
 1990 The Inspiral Carpets, Echo & the Bunnymen, Holly Johnson, Andy Richards, Geoff Emerick, Spike Stent, 21 Japonesas
 1991 Pearl Jam, Seal, Beverley Craven, Tin Machine, The Levellers, Ian McCulloch, Trevor Horn, Tim Palmer, Paul Samwell-Smith, Warne Livesey, Andy Richards
 1992 Sade, Sam Brown, Love and Rockets, Thunder, The Saw Doctors, The Almighty, Ned's Atomic Dustbin, Paul Samwell-Smith, Pat Moran, Andy Wallace
 1994 Gun, Skin, Julian Cope, Dodgy, The Almighty, Kiri Te Kanawa, The Three Tenors, Paul Samwell-Smith, Chris Sheldon, Mark Wallis, William Sheller, Mark Opitz 
 1995 The Bluetones, Wet Wet Wet, Paradise Lost, English National Opera, Kiki Dee, Black Sabbath
 1996 Oasis, Paul Weller, M People, Teenage Fanclub, The Wildhearts, Simon Dawson, Andy Wright, David Bianco, Owen Morris 
 1997 Oasis, Goldie, Portishead, Kula Shaker, Beth Orton, Ana Torroja, Mark Wallis, Steve Harris, Youth, Gary Langan, Tony Mansfield
 1998 Supergrass, Cast, Mansun, Billie, James, The Lightning Seeds, Leon Redbone, Animal House, Hugh Jones, Tony Mansfield, Gil Norton, John Cornfield, Sam Williams
 1999 Steve Hillage, Dave Allen, Khaled, Puressence, The Crocketts, John Fryer, Jim Abbiss, Danny Cummings, Steve Harris, Mark Wallis
 2000 James, Muse, Ed Harcourt, Superstar, Big Sur, Brian Eno, Gary Langan, Mark Wallis, David Bottrill, Lars Winnerbäck
 2001 Beth Orton, My Vitriol, David Knopfler, Echt, Brainstorm, Tony Mansfield, John Timperley, Chris Kimsey, Michael Brauer 
 2002 Status Quo, Joe Jackson, Bonnie Tyler, Shaun Escoffery, Rich Costey, Jamie Cullum, Mew.

References

External links
Ridge Farm Studio

1975 establishments in England
Year of disestablishment missing
Companies based in West Sussex
Recording studios in England
Former recording studios
Horsham District
20th century in West Sussex